Diplotomma alboatrum is a species of lichen in the family Caliciaceae. It was first described as Lichen alboater by German lichenologist Georg Franz Hoffmann in 1784. Julius von Flotow transferred it to the genus Diplotomma in 1849. The lichen is widely distributed, and has been recorded in Europe, North America, and Australasia.

References

Caliciales
Lichen species
Lichens described in 1784
Lichens of Australia
Lichens of Europe
Lichens of New Zealand
Lichens of North America
Taxa named by Georg Franz Hoffmann